D.B.'s Delight was a locally produced St. Louis, Missouri children's television quiz show produced by CBS-owned affiliate KMOX-TV (later KMOV), Channel 4. The show ran 30 minutes on Saturdays and Sundays and aired in St. Louis from 1977 to 1988.

Cast 

D.B.'s Delight featured two regular co-hosts, including a live performer and a puppeteer.  The original live performer was radio personality Young Bobby Day- who hosted the program from 1977 to 1984- and later, radio personality Guy Phillips hosted from 1984-1988.  The puppet character was called "D.B. Doorbell" (performed, at various times throughout the years, by puppeteers Tom Brooks, Dale Thompson, Doug Kincaid, and Bobby Miller). In addition to prize giveaways (usually special show themed pens, pencils, and T-Shirts), the show also featured comedic sketches and appearances by St. Louis child performers Mickey Dougherty and Ryan Bollman.

Music & Format 

From 1977 to 1984, the show opened with Billy Preston's "Attitudes"; later- from 1984-1988- the show opened & closed with The J. Geils Band's "Freeze Frame". The format of the show consisted of three rounds, each featuring two contestants (6th grade students selected from a visiting area school, which made up the studio audience). 

In the early years, the show featured a brief, humorous preshow known as the "Joke Board", a "Rowan and Martin's Laugh-In" inspired segment featuring the show's stars telling jokes through small trapdoors in a colorfully painted wall.

During each round of D.B.'s Delight the live host asked questions of an educational nature and the contestant who had the correct answer was awarded points that would later determine the winner of that round.  The question topics included history, mathematics, science, geography and current events plus contestants were also asked music questions featuring a brief audio clip of pop music and the contestant would have to identify the title or artist of that clip.

The third and final round of the show, called "The Winners Round", started off with a brief humorous joke segment that featured puppet D.B. Doorbell dressed up in a red turban & cape (and holding a crystal ball); introduced as "The Divine Ding-Dong" by the show's live host- and accompanied by the opening bars of Steve Martin's "King Tut",  "The Divine Ding-Dong" would then attempt to correctly guess punchlines to jokes provided by members of the show's studio audience. This segment was a parody of the popular "Carnac the Magnificent" sketch then being performed by Johnny Carson on "The Tonight Show". After "The Divine Ding-Dong Segment, round three of the show then commenced, featuring a face-off between the two winners of Round 1 and Round 2. 

The four most successful winners from each season were invited back to participate in D.B.'s Grand Delight, a special program that aired at the end of the school year.

Production details 

Jan Landis was the original producer of the show (she was later succeeded by Debi Pittman); the shows were alternately directed by Carl Petre and Skip Goodrum . Puppeteer Dale Thompson designed & built the first "D.B. Doorbell" puppet character; this was replaced in 1981 by a "Kincaid Karacter" puppet designed and built by St. Louis puppeteers William Kincaid and Doug Kincaid, when Doug Kincaid assumed the role of lead puppeteer that same year.

A winner of many regional Emmy Awards- and a fond favorite of young St. Louis audiences growing up in the late 1970s and 1980s- D.B.'s Delight was followed up by KMOV in 1988 by its production of "Gator Tales", another popular St. Louis children's television show.

Winners 
Each show pitted 4 students from one 6th Grade class in the St. Louis area.  The four most successful contestants from each season of D.B.'s Delight were invited to compete in D.B.'s Grand Delight.

Ron Fedorchak, playing for Lewis & Clark Junior High of Wood River, Illinois won the Grand Delight during the 1977–1978 school year.

References 

St. Louis Globe-Democrat, Wednesday, March 25, 1981, Section E Front Page, "The Disco Kid is dancing along on the road to fame", article on Ryan Bollman & D.B.'s Delight.
St. Louis Globe-Friday, July 5, 1985, Living Section Front Page, "Talented brothers are creators...", article on Bill and Doug Kincaid and D.B.'s Delight.
Original letter from the TV show producers, 1978
 Inc._(magazine), September 10, 2018, "Meet the Company Behind Thousands of America's Favorite Mascots"- article on William Kincaid, Doug Kincaid, and The Kincaid Karacter Company

External links 
 Official Website of The Kincaid Karacter Puppets
  Article in St. Louis Post Dispatch 8-22-2008
 , September 10, 2018, "Meet the Company Behind Thousands of America's Favorite Mascots"- article on William Kincaid, Doug Kincaid, and The Kincaid Karacter Company

Student quiz television series
Local children's television programming in the United States
1977 American television series debuts
1988 American television series endings
1970s American children's game shows
1980s American children's game shows
American television shows featuring puppetry
Television in St. Louis
English-language television shows